Balurghat subdivision is an administrative subdivision of the Dakshin Dinajpur district in the Indian state of West Bengal.

Subdivisions
Dakshin Dinajpur district is divided into two administrative subdivisions:

.*2011

Administrative units
Balurghat subdivision has 4 police stations, 4 community development blocks, 4 panchayat samitis, 35 gram panchayats, 888 mouzas, 852 inhabited villages, 1 municipality, 3 census towns and 1 outgrowth. The only municipality is at Balurghat. The census towns are:  Par Patiram, Dakra and Chak Bhrigu. The outgrowth is Baidyanathpara. The subdivision has its headquarters at Balurghat.

Police stations
Police stations in Balurghat subdivision have the following features and jurisdiction:

Blocks
Community development blocks in Balurghat subdivision are:

Gram panchayats
The subdivision contains 35 gram panchayats under 4 community development blocks:

 Hili block consists of 5 gram panchayats, viz. Binshira, Hili, Panjul, Dhalpara and Jamalpur.
 Balurghat block consists of 11 gram panchayats, viz. Amritakhand, Chakvrigu, Gopalbati, Patiram, Bolla, Chingishpur, Jalghar, Vatpara, Boaldar, Danga and Najirpur.
 Kumarganj block consists of 8 gram panchayats, viz. Batun, Deor, Mohana, Safanagar, Bhour, Jakirpur, Ramkrisnapur and Samjia.
 Tapan block consists of 11 gram panchayats, viz. Ajmatpur, Gophanagar, Hazratpur, Rampara Chenchra, Autina, Gurail, Malancha, Tapanchandipur, Dwipkhanda, Harsura and Ramchandrapur.

Education
Dakshin Dinajpur district had a literacy rate of 72.82% (for population of 7 years and above) as per the census of India 2011. Balurghat subdivision had a literacy rate of 75.78%, Gangarampur subdivision 69.24%.

Given in the table below (data in numbers) is a comprehensive picture of the education scenario in Dakshin district for the year 2013-14:

Note: Primary schools include junior basic schools; middle schools, high schools and higher secondary schools include madrasahs; technical schools include junior technical schools, junior government polytechnics, industrial technical institutes, industrial training centres, nursing training institutes etc.; technical and professional colleges include engineering colleges, medical colleges, para-medical institutes, management colleges, teachers training and nursing training colleges, law colleges, art colleges, music colleges etc. Special and non-formal education centres include sishu siksha kendras, madhyamik siksha kendras, centres of Rabindra mukta vidyalaya, recognised Sanskrit tols, institutions for the blind and other handicapped persons, Anganwadi centres, reformatory schools etc.

The following institutions are in Balurghat subdivision:

Balurghat College was established as an Intermediate college in 1948 at Balurghat. Degree courses were added from 1953 onwards.

Balurghat Mahila Mahavidyalaya was established in 1970 at Balurghat.

Balurghat Law College was established in 2001 at Balurghat.

Jamini Majumdar Memorial College was established at Patiram in 2008.

Nathaniyal Murmu Memorial College was established at Tapan in 2011.

S.B.S. Government College, Hili was established at Hili in 2015.

Kumarganj College was established at Kumarganj in 2016.

Healthcare
The table below (all data in numbers) presents an overview of the medical facilities available and patients treated in the hospitals, health centres and sub-centres in 2014 in Dakshin Dinajpur district.  
 

.* Excluding nursing homes

Medical facilities available in Balurghat subdivision are as follows:

Hospitals: (Name, location, beds)
Balurghat General Hospital (District Hospital), Balurghat, 320 beds
Balurghat Police Hospital, Balurghat, 50 beds
Balurghat Poura Hospital and Matri Sadan, Balurghat, 32 beds
Rural Hospitals: (Name, block, location, beds)
Hili Rural Hospital, Hili CD Block, Hili, 25 beds
Kumarganj Rural Hospital, Kumarganj CD Block, Kumarganj, 30 beds
Tapan Rural Hospital, Tapan CD Block, Tapan, 30 beds
Khaspur Rural Hospital, Balurghat CD Block, Khaspur, 30 beds
Primary Health Centres: (CD Block-wise)(CD Block, PHC location, beds)
Kumarganj CD Block: Penitora (Samjia PHC) (10), Bathur (10), Deor (10)
Tapan CD Block: Monahali (10),  Chenchra (Rampara (Chenchra) PHC) (10), Balapur (Malancha PHC) (10)
Balurghat CD Block: Bara Kasipur (Bharandah (Bolader) PHC) (10), Bolla (10), Nazirpur (10), Chak Bhrigu (Dakra PHC) (10), Kamarpara (10)
Hili CD Block: Tear (Binsira PHC) (10), Trimohini (10)

Electoral constituencies
Lok Sabha (parliamentary) and Vidhan Sabha (state assembly) constituencies in Balurghat subdivision were as follows:

References

Subdivisions of West Bengal
Subdivisions in Dakshin Dinajpur district
Dakshin Dinajpur district